Thalasso is a 2019 French comedy film directed by Guillaume Nicloux, starring the writer Michel Houellebecq and the actor Gérard Depardieu as versions of themselves. It places Houellebecq at a health spa where he goes through a series of treatments while Depardieu keeps him company. The film has been described as a sequel to Nicloux's The Kidnapping of Michel Houellebecq (2014).

Plot
The film is set at a centre for seawater therapy in Cabourg. The writer Michel Houellebecq goes through a series of treatments offered at the health spa. He is accompanied by the actor Gérard Depardieu.

Cast
 Michel Houellebecq as Michel Houellebecq
 Gérard Depardieu as Gérard Depardieu
 Maxime Lefrançois as Maxine
 Mathieu Nicourt as Mathieu
 Luc Schwarz as Luc

Production
Guillaume Nicloux had previously made multiple films where the writer Michel Houellebecq appears as an actor as well as several films featuring Gérard Depardieu. Notably, he made The Kidnapping of Michel Houellebecq (2014), where Houellebecq performs as a version of himself. Although Thalasso has been described as a sequel to The Kidnapping of Michel Houellebecq, Nicloux says it was not conceived as such and is a standalone work. He says it did not begin with the idea of creating an encounter between Houellebecq and Depardieu, but with a screenplay he wrote that had "a particularity" in that the main characters are played by themselves. Houellebecq and Depardieu did not know each other before but responded positively when Nicloux told them he planned to create an encounter between them within a fictional story. The film also features Maxime Lefrançois, Mathieu Nicourt and Luc Schwarz, who played the abductors in the 2014 film and reprise their roles.

The scenes were filmed in one take with a multiple-camera setup.

Release
The release in France was on 21 August 2019 and distributed by Wild Bunch. The film was shown at festivals in 2019 and 2020, including in the official competition of the 2019 San Sebastián International Film Festival.

Reception
Jordan Mintzer of The Hollywood Reporter described it as a sequel to The Kidnapping of Michel Houellebecq and said you need to see the first film for Thalasso to fully make sense. Mintzer said Thalasso is less amusing than the first film and has "a plot so thin you can barely see it".

References

External links
 

2019 comedy films
French comedy films
2010s French-language films
Films directed by Guillaume Nicloux
Michel Houellebecq
Medical-themed films
Hydrotherapy
Films about writers
Films about actors
Films set in Normandy
Films shot in Normandy